Narses was a Byzantine general of Armenian ancestry active during the reigns of the emperors Maurice and Phocas in the late sixth and early seventh centuries CE.  He commanded the army in Mesopotamia as the magister militum per Orientem under Maurice. Together with Khosrow II, he fought against the Sasanian usurper Bahram Chobin. 

When Phocas overthrew Maurice and seized the throne, Narses refused to recognize the usurper. Besieged by Phocas' troops in the city of Edessa, Narses called for Khosrau to aid him and was rescued by the Persian forces.  He attempted to salvage the situation with a diplomatic mission but was burned alive in Constantinople by Phocas' government after having been promised safety.

References

7th-century deaths
6th-century Byzantine generals
7th-century Byzantine generals
7th-century executions by the Byzantine Empire
Byzantine people of Armenian descent
Executed Byzantine people
Generals of Maurice
Magistri militum
People executed by burning
People of the Roman–Sasanian Wars
Year of birth unknown